The 2012 STP 400 was a NASCAR Sprint Cup Series stock car race held on April 22, 2012 at Kansas Speedway in Kansas City, Kansas. Contested over 267 laps, it was the eighth race of the 2012 season. Denny Hamlin of Joe Gibbs Racing took his second win of the season, while Martin Truex Jr. finished second and Jimmie Johnson finished third.

Report

Background

Kansas Speedway is one of ten  intermediate tracks to hold NASCAR races. The track's turns are banked at fifteen degrees, while the front stretch, the location of the finish line, is 10.4 degrees. The back stretch, opposite of the front, is at only five degrees. The racetrack has seats for 82,000 spectators.

Before the race, Greg Biffle led the Drivers' Championship with 273 points, and Matt Kenseth stood in second with 254. Dale Earnhardt Jr. was third in the Drivers' Championship also with 254 points, one ahead of Martin Truex Jr. and five ahead of Kevin Harvick in fourth and fifth. Denny Hamlin with 242 was eight ahead of Tony Stewart, as Jimmie Johnson with 233 points, was eight ahead of Ryan Newman, and fourteen in front of Clint Bowyer. In the Manufacturers' Championship, Chevrolet was leading with 48 points, six ahead of Ford. Toyota, with 34 points, was 30 points ahead of Dodge in the battle for third. Brad Keselowski was the race's defending race winner after winning it in 2011.

Practice and qualifying

Two practice sessions were held before the race on Friday. The first session lasted 80 minutes long, while the second was 90 minutes long. Kyle Busch was quickest with a time of 31.083 seconds in the first session, over one-tenth of a second faster than Carl Edwards. Kasey Kahne was third, followed by Landon Cassill, Earnhardt Jr., and Newman. Stewart was seventh, still within a second of Kyle Busch's time. In the second practice session, Johnson was fastest with a time of 30.865 seconds, only 0.113 seconds quicker than second-placed Mark Martin. Biffle took third place, ahead of Keselowski, Sam Hornish Jr. and Edwards. Jeff Burton managed to be seventh quickest.

Forty-six cars were entered for qualifying, but only forty-three can race because of NASCAR's qualifying procedure. A. J. Allmendinger clinched his second pole position during his career, with a time of 30.683 seconds. He was joined on the front row of the grid by Harvick. Joey Logano qualified third, Hamlin took fourth, and Martin started fifth. Truex Jr., Earnhardt Jr., Bowyer, Kahne, and Hornish Jr. rounded out the first ten positions. The three drivers who failed to qualify for the race were Tim Andrews, Jeff Green and Tony Raines, who had times of 31.820 and 31.846 seconds.

Race
The race, the eighth in the season, started at 1:16 p.m. EDT and was televised live in the United States on Fox. The conditions on the grid were dry before the race and overcast skies are expected.  Cole Cochran, of Kansas City Alliance Raceway Ministries, began pre-race ceremonies, by giving the invocation. Next, Jeremy Vitt performed the national anthem, and Victory Junction Gang Camp ambassadors gave the command for drivers to start their engines. During the pace laps, Logano had to move to the rear of the grid because of changing his engine.

Results

Qualifying

Race results

Standings after the race

Drivers' Championship standings

Manufacturers' Championship standings

Note: Only the top five positions are included for the driver standings.

References

NASCAR races at Kansas Speedway
STP 400
STP 400
STP 400